Bedford is a borough and spa town in and the county seat of Bedford County in the U.S. state of Pennsylvania. Bedford's population was 2,861 at the 2020 census.

History

The vicinity of Bedford was inhabited by Euro-American 'Indian' traders in the late 1740s and early 1750s. Actual settlers did not appear in the region until after Forbes Road was cut to enable the Forbes Expedition to reach Fort Duquesne in 1758. A village of sorts, created by the suttlers who followed the British Army, grew up around the fort, which was located two miles to the west of the Raystown trading post. The village of Bedford was laid out in 1766 by John Lukens. Bedford was incorporated on March 13, 1795. But because the citizens failed to fill the required posts at the time, the town had to be re-incorporated in 1816. For many years it was an important frontier military post. The Espy House in Bedford is notable for having been the headquarters of George Washington and his force of 13,000 while putting down the Whiskey Rebellion in 1794. The Federal Army troops are believed to have assembled near the Jean Bonnet Tavern just four miles west of Bedford.

In 1758, the British Army under General John Forbes came to the vicinity of John Ray's trading post to set up Fort Bedford as a supply depot on 'the Communication', the line of fortifications and supply depots between Carlisle and the Forks of the Allegheny. The fort was named for John Russell, the politically powerful 4th Duke of Bedford in England. Some believe this is how the town later got its name. Fort Bedford was built as one of the many British Army stepping stones through the state from Carlisle leading west to the Forks of the Ohio River. The Forks of the Ohio were claimed by the French who constructed Fort Duquesne on the site of an earlier British fort. The French wanted to control fur trading in the Ohio Valley and along the Mississippi River and its tributary, the Ohio River (formed by the merging of the Monongahela and Allegheny Rivers). Fort Bedford provided a refuge for settlers escaping Indian raids throughout the period of the American Revolutionary War. 

A myth about Fort Bedford claims that it was liberated ten years before the Revolution by American rebels, James Smith's Black Boys, making it the "first British fort to fall to American rebels" during the Revolution. The problem with this myth is that the fort was abandoned by the British Army in 1766 when Pontiac's Rebellion was put down, and the James Smith and the Black Boys raid was in 1769 ~ three years after the fort was no longer a 'British' fort. James Smith's memoirs is the only source of the myth. A group of men attacked a pack train taking goods (including guns and ammunition) to the Ohio valley to be traded with the Indians there. Those men were captured and were placed under guard in the only 'public' building large enough to serve as an impromptu jail. James Smith and his Black Boys attacked the fort/jail, which was being guarded by only three local settlers (not the British Army) and they set the legally imprisoned men free, stole a couple rifles and left. Despite committing his own crimes, James Smith tried to make it look like he was a modern day Robin Hood.

The fort later fell into ruin and collapsed before President Washington arrived in 1794. In 1958 a building was constructed in the manner of one of the fort's five blockhouses and currently houses the Fort Bedford Museum. The fort itself, which stood to the east of the museum structure was never reconstructed.

George Washington marched his army to Bedford in 1794 to subdue the Whiskey Rebellion. There was much more at stake than quieting the uprising of rebels angered by a tax on whiskey; Washington felt the Constitution itself was at risk. The rebellion mainly consisted of farmers who claimed that they could, due to the high cost of pack mule transport to the eastern cities, earn more selling whiskey instead of grain. (The fact of the matter is that a pound of whiskey weighs the same as a pound of grain.) The rebellion spread fast, and when it reached Pittsburgh some rebels threatened to burn the city to the ground. Anarchy was on its way; the British and French watched every move hoping they could come back and take over. Washington knew he had to act and make a statement; the laws of America would be obeyed. 12,950 militiamen were called to the south-western corner of the state leaving the rebels without many choices. One historian later stated, "It was at Bedford that the new federal government was finally to establish itself as sovereign in its own time and place."

Bedford County, at one time, was famous for its medicinal springs. Three resorts were developed in the county: Bedford Springs (in Bedford Township to the south of Bedford Borough), Chalybeate Springs (in Bedford Township to the east of Bedford Borough) and the White Sulphur Springs (In Harrison Township to the southwest of Bedford Borough). At the Bedford Springs Resort there is a mineral spring, a chalybeate spring, a limestone spring, a sulfur spring and two sweet springs. In the year 1804, a mechanic from Bedford, Jacob Fletcher, drank some of the water. The rheumatic pains and ulcers he had been suffering from troubled him less that night. From then on he often drank from the spring and soaked his limbs in the water. In a few weeks he was entirely cured. News spread and the "healing springs" quickly became popular.

The discovery of the curative springs at what would become known as the Bedford Springs Resort led Dr. John Anderson to purchase the nearby land and build a spa in 1804. Due to the lack of medicines in that time, people from great distances flocked to the hotel in search of a cure for their illness. They would come to Bedford Springs to "take the waters". The Bedford Springs Hotel was the first place in America to have an Olympic sized pool. President James Buchanan made it his "summer White House". While Buchanan was there the first trans-Atlantic cable message was sent to his room from Queen Victoria on August 17, 1858. The hotel, in 1855, also housed the only Supreme Court hearing ever to be held outside of the capital.

Chalybeate Springs Hotel, along with the nearby Bedford Springs Hotel, were popular resorts during the 19th century among the wealthy. Notable visitors to Bedford Springs included William Henry Harrison, James Polk, Zachary Taylor, Thaddeus Stevens. Rutherford B. Hayes, and Benjamin Harrison visited Chalybeate Springs Hotel, as did many other notable people.

U.S. Route 30, also known as the Lincoln Highway, passes through Bedford. Up until the opening of the Pennsylvania Turnpike in 1940, U.S. Route 30 was the key east-west route connecting Philadelphia to the west. In 1927, David Koontz built a coffee pot-shaped building, which was originally a diner. This building, a landmark in Bedford, was moved in 2003 to the Bedford County Fairgrounds.

The Bedford Historic District was added to the National Register of Historic Places in 1983.

Geography

Bedford is located in the center of Bedford County at  (40.016361, −78.504071). It is completely surrounded by Bedford Township.

The borough is accessible from Exit 146 of the Pennsylvania Turnpike at the midpoint between Harrisburg and Pittsburgh. U.S. Route 220 is a four-lane north-south highway that bypasses Bedford to the west and becomes Interstate 99 just north of town where it crosses the Pennsylvania Turnpike. US-220 Business passes through the center of Bedford as Richard Street. The Raystown Branch of the Juniata River, a tributary of the Susquehanna River, flows west to east through the center of Bedford.

Events
A Fall Foliage Festival is held in the beginning of October on the first two weekends of the month. The celebration stretches from Penn Street, down Juliana Street, to the park by the Fort Bedford Museum. The event includes many vendors, touring of the fort, the Children's Theater, pony rides, and an antique car show.

The Bedford County Fair takes place annually in July or August.  Alongside a classic midway of rides, games, and food vendors are a multitude of 4-H-sponsored events (including animal shows and livestock auctions), automobile racing, demolition derbies, and a petting zoo.  The automobile racing and demolition derbies take place at the Bedford Fairgrounds Speedway, adjacent to the remainder of the Fair.

Demographics

As of the census of 2000, there were 3,141 people, 1,536 households, and 832 families residing in the borough. The population density was 2,830.8 people per square mile (1,092.6/km²). There were 1,640 housing units at an average density of 1,478.0 per square mile (570.5/km²). The racial makeup of the borough was 97.71% White, 0.51% African American, 0.06% Native American, 0.76% Asian, 0.10% Pacific Islander, 0.13% from other races, and 0.73% from two or more races. Hispanic or Latino of any race were 0.80% of the population.

There were 1,536 households, 21.2% had children under the age of 18 living with them, 42.3% were married couples living together, 9.6% had a female householder with no husband present, and 45.8% were non-families. 40.5% of households were made up of individuals, and 19.7% had someone living alone who were 65 or older. The average household size was 2.04 and the average family size was 2.76.

In the borough the population was spread out, with 18.8% under the age of 18, 7.5% from 18 to 24, 26.1% from 25 to 44, 24.8% from 45 to 64, and 22.8% 65 or older. The median age was 43 years. For every 100 females, there were 80.7 males. For every 100 females age 18 and over, there were 77.5 males.

The median household income was $28,549 and the median family income  was $39,122. Males had a median income of $29,148 versus $21,375 for females. The per capita income for the borough was $18,028. About 8.5% of families and 11.9% of the population were below the poverty line, including 12.6% of those under age 18 and 7.7% of those age 65 or over.

Economy
Bedford has both Walmart and REI distribution centers, due to its close location to major highways and cities.

Transportation
Bedford County Airport is a public use airport in Bedford County. It is owned by the Bedford County Airport Authority and is located four nautical miles (7.4 km) north of the central business district of the borough of Bedford.

Media

Magazines
 Hometown Magazine

Newspapers
 Bedford Gazette

Television
Bedford receives television programming from the Johnstown-Altoona-State College, PA media market.

Radio
Six radio stations are licensed to serve Bedford:
 WBFD - 1310 AM
 WRAX - 1600 AM
 W254DF - 98.7 FM (rebroadcasts WBFD)
 WAYC - 100.9 FM
 W293DF - 106.5 FM (rebroadcasts WRAX)
 WBVE - 107.5 FM

Notable people
 William Mann Irvine (1865-1928) – founding headmaster of Mercersburg Academy
 Lawrence Taliafero (1794–1871) – U.S. diplomat to Dakota and Ojibwe nations, 1819–1839.
 John Tod (1779–1830) – U.S. Congressman for Pennsylvania from 1821 to 1824
 Henry Woods (1764–1826) – U.S. Congressman for Pennsylvania from 1799 to 1803

See also
 Cannondale Bicycle Corporation—Cannondale had a factory in Bedford from 1983 until 2015.

References

 Ned Frear, The Bedford Story: Fort Bedford (Pennsylvania: Gazette Publishing Company, 1998)
 Ned Frear, The Bedford Story: The Whiskey Rebellion (Pennsylvania: Gazette Publishing Company, 1998)
 Ned Frear, The Bedford Story: The Bedford Springs (Pennsylvania: Gazette Publishing Company, 1998)
 
 History of Bedford, Somerset and Fulton Counties, (Chicago, 1884)
 History of Bedford and Somerset Counties, (New York, 1906)

External links

 Borough of Bedford official website
 History of Bedford County during the Colonial and Revolutionary War periods
 Bedford County's Sestercentennial (2021) website
 Website devoted to possibly the only half-timber building associated with the French and Indian War still extant

County seats in Pennsylvania
Populated places established in 1751
Spa towns in the United States
Boroughs in Bedford County, Pennsylvania
1751 establishments in the Thirteen Colonies
1795 establishments in Pennsylvania